The de Havilland DH.50 was a 1920s British large single-engined biplane transport built by de Havilland at Stag Lane Aerodrome, Edgware, and licence-built in Australia, Belgium, and Czechoslovakia.

History
In the early 1920s, Geoffrey de Havilland realised that war surplus aircraft would need replacing, so his company designed a four-passenger-cabin biplane, the DH.50, using experience gained with the earlier de Havilland DH.9. The first DH.50 (registered G-EBFN) flew in August 1923 and was used within a few days by Alan Cobham to win a prize for reliability during trial flights between Copenhagen and Gothenburg. Only 17 aircraft were built by de Havilland; the rest were produced under licence. The different aircraft had a wide variety of engine fits.

In 1924, Cobham won the King's Cup Race air race in G-EBFN averaging 106 mph (171 km/h). Cobham made several long-range flights with the prototype until he replaced it with the second aircraft. The second aircraft (registered G-EBFO) was re-engined with the Armstrong Siddeley Jaguar engine and was designated the DH.50J. Cobham flew the aircraft on a 16,000 mi (25,750 km) flight from Croydon Airport to Cape Town between November 1925 and February 1926. The aircraft was later fitted with twin floats (produced by Short Brothers at Rochester) for a survey flight of Australia in 1926. On the outward flight from England to Australia, Cobham's engineer (A.B. Elliot) was shot and killed when they were overflying the desert between Baghdad and Basra. He was replaced by Sergeant Ward, a Royal Air Force engineer who was given permission to join the flight by his commanding officer. Also in 1926, a DH.50A floatplane was used in the first international flight made by the Royal Australian Air Force. The Chief of the Air Staff, Group Captain Richard Williams, and two crew members undertook a three-month, 10,000 mi (16,093 km) round trip from Point Cook, Victoria to the Pacific Islands.

Licence production
The aircraft was popular in Australia and de Havilland licensed its production there, leading to 16 aircraft being built. Qantas built four DH.50As and three DH.50Js, Western Australian Airlines built three DH.50As, and Larkin Aircraft Supply Company built one DH.50A. SABCA built three DH.50As in Brussels, Belgium and Aero built seven in Prague, then in Czechoslovakia. The British-built QANTAS DH.50 (G-AUER/VH-UER) was modified in Longreach, Queensland, to suit the Australian Inland Mission as an aerial ambulance. The aircraft was called Victory by the Rev. J Flynn and was the first aircraft used by the Royal Flying Doctor Service of Australia.

Variants
 DH.50 : Single-engined light transport biplane.

 DH.50A : Powered by one 240 hp (179 kW) Siddeley Puma inline engine.
 DH.50J : The Australian-built Qantas fleet were powered by one 450 hp (287 kW) Bristol Jupiter Mk IV radial engine. Other radial engines were fitted in other aircraft in the DH50J series.

Operators
Australia
Australian Aerial Services Ltd
Holdens Air Transport

Qantas
Rockhampton Aerial Services Ltd
Royal Australian Air Force
West Australian Airlines Ltd

Belgium
Sabena

Czechoslovakia
ČSA

Iraq
Iraq Petroleum Transport Company Ltd

New Zealand
Royal New Zealand Air Force

United Kingdom
Air Taxis Ltd
Brooklands School of Flying Ltd
Imperial Airways Ltd 
North Sea Aerial and General Transport Company Ltd
Northern Air Lines Ltd

Specifications (dh.50 with Puma engine)

See also

References

Notes

Bibliography
 (part work 1982–85)

 Grant, James Ritchie. "Anti-Clockwise: Australia the Wrong Way". Air Enthusiast, No. 82, July–August 1999, pp. 60–63.

External links

 A photograph of the float-equipped DH.50S

Aircraft first flown in 1923
Biplanes
1920s British civil utility aircraft
DH.050
Racing aircraft
Single-engined tractor aircraft